Leong Ka Hang (born 22 November 1992 in Macau) is a former Macanese professional footballer who played as a striker.

Early career
Leong Ka Hang broke his arm three times when he was 15, 16 and soon after. The doctor told him to stop playing but he now wears a plastic protective guard on his left arm and has no problems.

Leong Ka Hang became the Macau Footballer of the Year aged only 18, then he went to Japan for football training in August 2011 for half a month.

Club career

Tai Po
From 8 September 2014, Leong Ka Hang has a trial with Hong Kong Premier League club Tai Po. Coach Pau Ka Yiu said he has made a good first impression but he will observe him for a little while longer before making a decision. Tai Po FC announced his signing on 6 November. Leong Ka Hang made his debut as a second-half substitute on 22 November 2014, his 22nd birthday, against Sun Pegasus, but he failed to break the deadlock and the match ended 0:0.

Pegasus
Leong Ka Hang joined Pegasus in the summer of 2016. He began the year as an Asian foreign player but was naturalized in December.

Lee Man
Following an injury-ridden 2017–18 season, Leong decided to leave Pegasus. On 13 July, he confirmed to a Macanese news outlet that he had signed with Lee Man, a club coached by former Macau manager Chan Hiu Ming.

International career
In 2009, Leong Ka Hang was called up by Macau for the 2010 AFC U-19 Championship qualification matches held in Thailand. He scored Macau's only goal in the 54th minute in the 5–1 defeat against Korea Republic. He scored 4 goals in the 4–3 victory to Laos and he scored again in the 2–3 defeat to Bangladesh.

On 2 July 2011, in the 2014 FIFA World Cup qualifiers, he was called up for Macau national football team to play against Vietnam. In the second-leg, he scored one goal for his team. But Macau still lost to Vietnam 1–13 after two-legs.

In February 2011, in the 2012 AFC Challenge Cup qualifying playoff round, Leong Ka Hang scored a goal each away and at home, but Macau lost to Cambodia 4-5 on aggregate after extra time.

On 3 October 2011, Leong Ka Hang scored, giving his side the first lead of the game, against Hong Kong national football team in the 2011 Long Teng Cup. But Hong Kong came back to win 5–1.

On 8 July 2012, at the 2013 AFC U-22 Championship qualifiers, Leong Ka Hang scored a goal against Australia U22 national football team but Macau lost 3–2.

On 14 October 2014, Leong Ka Hang scored one goal to help Macau force a 2–2 draw with visitors Singapore in an international friendly at the football ground of Macau University of Science and Technology.

On 15 November 2016, Leong Ka Hang was named the winner of the MVP award during the 2016 AFC Solidarity Cup awards ceremony at Sarawak Stadium.

Career statistics

International goals
Scores and results list Macau's goal tally first.

Honours

Club
Lee Man
 Hong Kong Sapling Cup: 2018–19

International
Macau
 AFC Solidarity Cup: Runners-Up (2016)

Individual 
 AFC Solidarity Cup Most Valuable Player: 2016

Personal life
In 15 November 2018, Leong married his girlfriend of four years, Latte Iao Lai San.

References

External links 
 
 Leong Ka Hang at HKFA
 

1992 births
Living people
Macau footballers
Macau international footballers
Hong Kong First Division League players
Hong Kong Premier League players
C.D. Monte Carlo players
Tai Po FC players
Lee Man FC players
TSW Pegasus FC players
Expatriate footballers in Hong Kong
Association football forwards
University of Macau alumni